Steinweiss is a surname. Notable people with the surname include: 

Alex Steinweiss (1917–2011), American graphic designer
Homer Steinweiss (born 1982), American drummer